The Mizell Brothers were an American record producing team in the 1970s, consisting of Larry Mizell (born February 17, 1944) and Alphonso "Fonce" Mizell (January 15, 1943 – July 5, 2011). They worked together on a string of jazz or R&B albums.

History
Larry earned a degree in engineering and Fonce Mizell earned a degree in music from Howard University. While there they formed and performed in a jazz vocal quartet, the Vanlords. In the early 1970s, Larry and Fonce Mizell moved to California to start their own company, Sky High Productions. They went on to produce albums for Blue Note Records that set the tone for jazz fusion and the era. The Mizell Brothers often used the same musicians on their albums, including Harvey Mason on drums, Mayuto Correa on percussion, Melvin "Wah Wah Watson" Ragin and David T. Walker on guitar, Chuck Rainey on bass and Jerry Peters on piano. Freddie Perren and Chuck Davis were sometimes involved as co-writers or co-producers.

Later hits of Sky High Productions include A Taste of Honey's platinum-selling roller-rink anthem of 1978 "Boogie Oogie Oogie", L.T.D.'s "Love Ballad", a number 1 R&B hit (#20 pop) in 1976 and Mary Wells' dance funk 12-inch "Gigolo" in 1982. Younger brother Rodney Mizell co-wrote some of their songs, although most material initially was written by Larry Mizell, later joined by Fonce. They also included a number of Motown hits on Donald Byrd's albums including Just My Imagination and Dancing in the Street. In the 1980s, the Mizell brothers retired from the record industry, but returned in the 2000s. Larry Mizell wrote and performed vocals on the song "Play with the Changes" on the 4hero album of the same name in 2007.

Larry
As an electrical engineer, Larry Mizell performed testing and reliability work on the Lunar Module for the NASA Apollo program. He was one of the first to do research on liquid crystals, which today are used in displays (LCD).

Alphonso
Alphonso Mizell was a member of The Corporation, the Motown hit-making production team that wrote and produced all of The Jackson 5's early hits from 1969 through 1971, including "I Want You Back," "ABC," "The Love You Save," "Mama's Pearl," and "Maybe Tomorrow."  The Corporation also consisted of Motown founder Berry Gordy plus writer-producers Deke Richards, who brought Fonce to the company, and Freddie Perren, a classmate of the Mizells at Howard who also later worked for Sky High Productions.

When Motown moved to Los Angeles, the Mizells joined up with trumpet player Donald Byrd under whom they had studied while at Howard University. Their first album, Black Byrd on the Blue Note label, was the first of a string of albums together that would define jazz-funk and lay the foundation for acid jazz and neo soul.
Alphonso died of heart failure on July 5, 2011 at age 68.

Personal life
According to Larry Mizell's son, Larry Mizell Jr., the Mizell Brothers are cousins to Run-DMC member Jam Master Jay as well as Ronnie Spector, Estelle Bennett and Nedra Talley of the 1960s girl group The Ronettes and related to songwriter Andy Razaf.

Discography

References

External links

RBMA Radio On Demand - Melbourne Marvels - Mizell Brothers (Sky High Productions, Los Angeles) on Red Bull Music Academy Radio
Mizell Brothers – a Red Bull Music Academy (RBMA) video lecture session
Mizell Brothers fanpage

Record producers from New York (state)
Record production duos
American songwriting teams
Sibling musical duos
Motown artists
Blue Note Records artists
Capitol Records artists
American pop music groups
American soul musical groups
Run-DMC